The 1924 season of Auckland Rugby League was its 15th. Marist won the first grade championship for the first time in their history after defeating Devonport in the final by 20 points to 17 in front of a club record crowd of 17,000 at Carlaw Park. While City won the Roope Rooster competition for the 4th time.

News

First grade competition 
At a Management Committee meeting on 9 April, the Mangere United team, and Ellerslie clubs who had requested to enter senior teams in the First Grade competition were accepted, bringing the total number of teams to nine. The Mangere team registered its colours and green and black. The suggested format was one where after the first round the top six teams would continue while the bottom three teams would have other matches arranged for them. However all nine teams remained in the grade until the end of the season. The Mangere United team was a combined team from the Manukau and Mangere clubs. Both clubs retained their own identity in the junior grades.

On the opening day of the season all four First Grade matches were played on Carlaw Park. The junior matches on the same day were postponed as the railway workers were on strike and there was no way for the players to reach the outer suburban grounds which were used for matches in these grades.

Lou Brown transfer issue 
Lou Brown, the New Zealand international had played for Newton Rangers in 1922 and 1923 however at the end of the season he moved to England to play for Wigan. He had been granted a release by Newton and New Zealand Rugby League. Upon his return he wished to play for the City Rovers club and he turned out for them despite being told by the Auckland Rugby League that he was not eligible to play for them. City were adamant that he had been fully released and could play for any team. The New Zealand Rugby League Council supported the decision but Brown played anyway. He was subsequently suspended for 3 matches. City took the extraordinary step of withdrawing its team from the competition and they defaulted their Round 9 match with Mangere United. On 18 July Newton held a special board meeting and agreed to grant Brown a transfer and thus the issue was finally settled.

Manukau Rovers club switches to rugby union 
The entire Manukau Rovers club switched to rugby union after a dispute with Auckland Rugby League. The issue arose after one of their players (King) was suspended for four playing Saturdays. He had been suspended because he was registered with the Manukau club but "suddenly joined, or played, for a Mangere team without having been granted a transfer". The Manukau club played as a combined side with Mangere and were known as Mangere United for this season. An opposing team had protested and King had in the meantime moved back to the Manukau club. The Manukau club took exception to the decision and refused to play any of its six teams in the following grades: Second, Third, Fourth, Fifth, Sixth A, and Sixth B. It then went a step further by switching the entire club to rugby union with the Auckland Rugby Union accepting them. The Secretary of the club, C.J, Williams disputed the way the ARL had handled the matter and several of the facts in a letter to the Auckland Star. The ARL Chairman, Mr. W. Hammill replied to the letter "that the matters contained therein were hardly correct".

United Suburbs club formation
At the Auckland Rugby League meeting of April 2 the affiliation of the United Suburbs club was approved. Their club colours were gold with a black badge. Two weeks later at the management committee meeting their colours were registered however they were now maroon and gold.

Goals from marks 
At the ARL Management Committee meeting on 13 August, the Referee's Association reported that goals from marks would no longer be permitted. This rule would come into place from Saturday, 23 August onwards.

Monteith Shield (1st grade championship) 
A record nine teams competed in the First Grade competition in 1924 with the addition of the Mangere and Ellerslie senior teams. Mangere had their colours registered as green and black. It was initially decided that after the first round the bottom three teams would drop out of the competition for the second round. At the end of the first round these teams were Mangere, and Ellerslie. However, this was later rescinded and all teams remained in the competition until the end of the season.

Monteith Shield standings

Monteith Shield fixtures

Round 1

Round 2

Round 3 
In the match at Devonport Domain Ben Davidson was knocked unconscious and had to be taken to hospital. City had a bye the following weekend and he returned to play in Round 5. Neville St George and Alf Townsend were ordered off in the City match with Devonport. They were the two hookers and there had been issues with the scrum.

Round 4 
Two matches were postponed in Round 4 as the league decided that they wanted the #1 field in the best possible condition for the exhibition match between City Rovers and Marist Old Boys of Christchurch. The weather had been particularly poor in the lead up with the previous weekend seeing all football in Auckland cancelled. These postponed matches were unique in that they were eventually played 10 days later on a Tuesday morning at 9.30am. This would surely be one of the only times a senior match had been played on a working weekday morning in the competitions history.

Round 5

Round 4 postponed matches

Round 6

Round 7 
Referee Bill Murray was refereeing his 50th first grade match in the clash between Devonport and Mangere at the Devonport Domain. He became only the second referee to achieve this feat after Archie Ferguson 2 years earlier. There was controversy in the match between City Rovers and Richmond as the City team fielded Lou Brown who had not been granted clearance by either Auckland Rugby League or New Zealand Rugby League. Brown had previously played for Newton and had been released to play for Wigan in England. After returning he wanted to turn out for the City club but Newton claimed that he had been released on the grounds that he would return to play for them alone. Brown was later suspended for 3 matches before rejoining the Newton team for their match against Marist.

Round 8

Round 9 
City defaulted their match against Mangere United in protest at the decision to not allow Lou Brown to register for the club after returning from England.

Round 10 
In the Athletic match with Richmond, Graham was ordered off for Athletic as was McMillan for Richmond. Richmond had lost Whittington to an injury early in the second half and with the score 25–0 with 6 minutes to go they threw in the towel and the match ended.

Round 11

Round 12

Round 13

Round 14

Round 15 
The win by City over Devonport was a competition milestone as it was City's 100th win in First Grade. They were the first club to achieve this milestone and did so in their 15th season and 149th game.

Round 16 
Near full-time in the match between Marist and Devonport, Kiwi international Bill Stormont was ordered off.
 
In the Newton match with Ponsonby a very unusual incident took place. L Williams for the Newton team was dribbling the ball down field and when he kicked ahead to chase, the ball went over the cross bar. He ran through to 'score the try' but the referee awarded a drop goal rather than a try.

Round 17 
It is unlikely that the Mangere v Ponsonby match took place as the Auckland representative team was playing a match against the South Auckland team in Hamilton at the same time. Many of the selected players chose to stay and play for their Auckland club teams in important matches. The team that did end up playing in the representative match featured seven players from the Ponsonby and Mangere teams and there were no reports of a match between the two sides in any newspaper. A table published at the end of the season also only credited Mangere with 14 matches, not 15 which is what they would have played had the match taken place.

Final

Roope Rooster knockout competition 
City Rovers won the Roope Rooster for the 4th time in their history, defeating Ponsonby who were attempting to win their third consecutive title, in the final by 6 points to 5.

Round 1

Round 2

Semi finals

Final

Top try scorers and point scorers
The lists include points scored in the First Grade competition and the Roope Rooster. Joe Hadley of Athletic led the league in tries scored with 12, while Craddock Dufty was once again the top scorer with 91 points from 9 tries, 29 conversions and 3 penalties.

Devonport had a try and conversion unattributed in a match. While the match between Mangere United and Ellerslie won by Mangere United 18 to 10 had no points attributed to any player. It is possible that M Paul for Mangere scored more tries than the 9 he is credited with and more than the 3 goals he kicked.

Exhibition matches 
City Rovers played Marist of Christchurch at Carlaw Park in May and were victorious by 16 points to 9. At the end of the season Marist, who had won the First Grade Championship met City Rovers, who had won the Roope Rooster and the two teams played out a 10 all draw on Monday morning as part of the Labour Day celebrations to officially finish the season for Auckland Rugby League.

City v Marist (Christchurch)

City v Marist

Lower grades 
There were 6 lower grade competitions in 1924 with the 6th grade split into an A and B division.

Second grade
Otahuhu United won the competition after defeating Richmond Rovers 17-5 on September 6 in the final. The standings are incomplete with around 18 rounds being played. Athletic withdrew after 3 rounds, Marist and Ellerslie withdrew after 7 rounds, and the Manukau side withdrew when the Manukau board switched to rugby union in protest at a decision by Auckland Rugby League in July. Kingsland won the knockout final when they defeated Otahuhu 6 points to 3 on October 18.
{|
|-
|

Third grade
City Rovers won the competition after defeating Devonport United 7-5 on September 6 in the final. The standings are incomplete with 16 rounds being played but with most teams only having 3-5 results reported. City also won the knockout final on October 4 when they beat Athletic in the final 18-8. Marist were listed to play in round one but withdrew after that, Victoria Cruising Club also entered a team but had no fixtures after round 2, and Kingsland B also did not have any fixtures beyond round 2. Manukau withdrew in July after their boards decision to switch to rugby in protest at a transfer suspension of one of their players.
{|
|-
|

Fourth grade
The competition was played over 14 rounds. Ponsonby United B won the championship after beating Richmond 10-8 in the final on August 30. Richmond won the knockout final when they defeated Parnell 3-2 on October 11. City withdrew after 7 rounds, while Takapuna, and Mangere, and withdrew after round 11 rounds. The Manukau side withdrew in July along with their entire club which switched codes to form the Manukau rugby side.
{|
|-
|

Fifth grade
Ponsonby won the championship after Newton defaulted to them in round 20. Marist entered a team but withdrew either prior to or after one week. Devonport withdrew after 2 rounds, while Manukau withdrew along with the rest of their club which switched to rugby union in July. The majority of match results were not reported so the standings are very incomplete. In round 5 it was reported in both the Auckland Star and the New Zealand Herald that Newton had beaten Athletic 82-0.
{|
|-
|

Sixth grade A
Athletic won the championship when they beat City A 6-3 in the final on October 11. Two weeks prior City A defeated Athletic 5-3 in a 'semi-final' which forced the playoff for the championship. It had been Athletics only defeat of the season. Leys Institute scored their first try of the season in a 25-3 loss to Parnell on September 13.
{|
|-
|

Sixth grade B
Ellerslie United finished with a 12 win 0 loss season to win the championship. They scored 125 points and conceded 33, and were managed by Mr E. Chapman, and J. Poland. Ellerslie and Richmond met in the knockout final on September 20 but the result was not reported. Ponsonby seemingly withdrew after 2 rounds. Manukau withdrew along with all their other sides when they switched to rugby union midseason in protest.
{|
|-
|

House matches
A series of house matches were played during the season between the following sides: 
Sharland and Company
Kempthorne
Ross and Glendining
Palmer, Collins and Whittaker
Unity and Leightons
Clarke and Matheson
Herald
Mennie and Dey's
Hayman's Limited
Wisman's Limited
Star
Nathan
United Printers (won the Morrison shield when Combined Printers defaulted to them in their one off match)
Combined Printers
Smith and Smith
Herbert Brothers

Representative fixtures 
Ernie Asher, Edwin Fox, and Ronald MacDonald were appointed selectors for the season with Bill Davidson the coach and Henry Donovan the manager. Auckland played three matches against Australian Universities on 4, 7, and 14 June. In the first match Auckland defeated the University side by 15 to 7. In the second meeting Auckland again won, this time more easily by 17 points to 2. The visiting captain congratulated the Auckland team but made mention of the conditions by saying that “yours are certainly better wet day footballers than we are but this is to be expected when you realise that my club, Sydney University has not played on a wet ground since early in 1922 season”. They had their wish somewhat in the third match with much improved weather conditions and were able to come home strongly in the second half to draw the match 14–14 in front of 11,500 people.

On 26 July in front of 20,000 spectators the touring England side defeated Auckland by 24 points to 11. In the curtain-raisers Ellerslie Sixth Grade B defeated City Sixth Grade B by 5 points to 2, and City Second grade defeated their Richmond counterparts by 8 points to 7. On the Wednesday following, an Auckland provincial team featuring Auckland players from the greater region including the Waikato region played England and lost 28 to 13 in front of 7,000 spectators.

On 20 September an Auckland team played South Auckland in Hamilton and were defeated easily by 21 points to 5. The team was supposed to be a full strength Auckland team but as the club competition was entering its key stages many of the first team players remained behind to play for their clubs. As a result, many players from the struggling Newton team made the trip to Hamilton.

Auckland v Australian Universities

Auckland v Australian Universities

Auckland v Australian Universities
Frank Delgrosso had to come on the replace George Davidson after he collided badly with teammate Clarrie Polson when they were both going after the ball. Polson received a bad cut over his eye and he also later had to retire and was replaced by Billy Ghent.

Probables v Possibles trial match

Auckland B v Hamilton
Wilson Hall broke his collar bone during the second half and had to leave the field. The Auckland B team consisted of Charles Gregory, Paul, Hec Brisbane, Ivan Littlewood, Lyall Stewart, Wilson Hall, Garrett, Wally Somers, Jim O'Brien (Devonport), Len Mason, McNeil, Shirley, and Bill Te Whata.

Auckland v England
There is film footage of the match taken by Tarr Film and archived on the New Zealand Archive of Film, television and Sound Ngā Taonga website. In scoring on halftime Ben Davidson was knocked out. At the start of the second half Auckland attempted to replace him with Lou Brown who ran out on to the field. However the England captain when seeing this objected as replacements were forbidden in the second half of rugby league matches at this time. Auckland were forced to play with 12 players for a time until Davidson recovered well enough to return to the field.

Auckland Province v England

Auckland B v Lower Waikato

Auckland v South Auckland (Waikato)

Junior representative fixtures

Auckland representative matches played and scorers

References

External links 
 Auckland Rugby League Official Site

Auckland Rugby League seasons
Auckland Rugby League